Somerville station was a train station on the Fitchburg Railroad in Somerville, Massachusetts.

History

A short-lived station opened at Kent Street in 1842. The station building was located on the north side of the tracks, just west of Park Street. Like Union Square and other local stops, Somerville was served primarily by Lexington Branch trains in the mid-19th century.

Planning to eliminate the eleven remaining grade crossings in Somerville, five of which were on the Fitchburg Route mainline, began in 1900. In 1906, the city engineer proposed to raise  of the line between Beacon Street and Somerville Avenue to eliminate the five level crossings, but that scheme was not adopted. The other four crossings were eliminated in 1908–1912, but the Park Street grade crossing remained. In 1935, the city requested that the crossing be replaced with a bridge as part of a Works Progress Administration-funded grade crossing elimination program. It was not, and the location has continued to see collisions.

Horsecar and later electric streetcar service cut ridership at urban stations; by 1917,  and Somerville stations were served by 4–5 daily Watertown Branch trains plus several off-peak mainline local trains. As passenger volumes dwindled, the station building was rented to an upholstery maker by 1924. By 1929, their only service was two inbound and one outbound Watertown Branch train. Service to the two stations ended on July 9, 1938, along with the end of passenger service on the Watertown Branch.

References

Stations along Boston and Maine Railroad lines
Former railway stations in Massachusetts
Railway stations in Somerville, Massachusetts
Railway stations in the United States closed in 1938
Railway stations in the United States opened in 1842